= Nihotunga =

Scientific classification
- Domain: Eukaryota
- Kingdom: Animalia
- Phylum: Arthropoda
- Class: Malacostraca
- Order: Amphipoda
- Family: Nihotungidae
- Genus: Nihotunga; Barnard, 1972

Genus of crustaceans

Nihotunga is a genus of crustaceans belonging to the monotypic family Nihotungidae.

The species of this genus are found in Australia and New Zealand.

Species:

- Nihotunga iluka Barnard, 1972
- Nihotunga noa Barnard, 1972
- Nihotunga traudlina Ruffo, 2004
